Federal elections were held in Switzerland on 21 October 1979. The Social Democratic Party and the Free Democratic Party emerged as the largest parties in the National Council, both winning 51 of the 200 seats.

Results

National Council

By constituency

Council of the States

References

Switzerland
1979 in Switzerland
Federal elections in Switzerland
October 1979 events in Europe
Federal